Anastasiya Yakimova (born 1 November 1986) is a former tennis player from Belarus. She made it to the third round of the 2007 Australian Open, defeating Ai Sugiyama of Japan, a seeded player, on the way in the second round.

The last tournament on the ITF Women's Circuit she played in August 2017, in Las Palmas de Gran Canaria.

Career
Yakimova began the year by qualifying for the 2009 Medibank International Sydney. She defeated Stéphanie Cohen-Aloro, Sophie Ferguson and Klára Zakopalová en route to qualifying. She faced Annabel Medina Garrigues in the first round and lost in three sets. She then headed to the Australian Open where she lost to Gisela Dulko, also in three sets. She played her first ITF tournament of the year at the $50k event in Cali, Colombia. As the fourth seed, Yakimova battled through to the final where she defeated Rossana de los Ríos to take her seventh ITF title.

She then qualified for both Indian Wells and Miami, two Premier Mandatory events. In Indian Wells, she defeated Varvara Lepchenko before falling to reigning champion Ana Ivanovic. In Miami, she beat fellow Olga Govortsova and then 13th seed Marion Bartoli to reach the third round. There she lost to Alisa Kleybanova.

At the 2009 Barcelona Ladies Open, Yakimova qualified and managed to make it to her first WTA quarterfinal of the year. She defeated Sorana Cîrstea and Magdaléna Rybáriková before falling to eventual champion, Roberta Vinci. She then played in the $50k Saint-Gaudens event as the top seed. She made it to the final where she defeated Yanina Wickmayer for her second title of the year. Then, in Strasbourg she received main-draw entry without qualifying. She defeated Maret Ani in the first round before falling to eventual finalist Aravane Rezaï.

At the 2009 French Open, she was drawn against comeback player Maria Sharapova in the first round, losing in three sets.

In 2011, she won the $100k Bahamas Open.

WTA career finals

Doubles: 3 (2 titles, 1 runner-up)

ITF Circuit finals

Singles: 25 (13–12)

Doubles: 18 (11–7)

Performance timelines

Singles

Doubles

External links
 
 
 

1986 births
Living people
Tennis players from Minsk
Belarusian female tennis players
Belarusian expatriate sportspeople in Spain